The National School of Sciences (NSS) formerly known as the National Institute of Science and Technology (NIST), was established in 1993. It is located in Lainchour, Kathmandu, Nepal. The patron of the institute is Madhav Prasad Baral, who is also the academic in charge and similarly vice principal is Pranita Sharma Baral.The school offers science and management courses, primarily focusing on science. The institute is a part of a larger NIST Foundation which has multiple other branches which offer education from the secondary level up to the graduate levels.

The National school of science (NSS) is a premier education institute managed by the NIST foundation that was established three decades ago. The core objective of the foundation, as an apex body, have been to establish education institutions, and provide students academic programmes from pre-school to high-school to university.” Institute is open Sunday to Friday 5AM-5PM. Classrooms are spaciously designed to accommodate thirty-six students. Student furniture is chosen so as to provide the necessary comfort and support for proper seating posture taking into account the long hours students put in inside the classroom. Each classroom is equipped with a fixed projector and access to high internet connectivity to ensure the use of tech in learning. Student and teacher get 1 hour of lunch break per day and 15 mins rest break after every 2 classes. The school has provision of canteen for students and they can bring their lunch if they want. Canteen serves freshly prepared and well-balanced diet of veg and non-veg dishes.

Applicants must pass the entrance exam in a related course to enroll at NIST. Institute has a prescribed set of school uniform which all students must adhere to. Uniform includes shirt, pant, tie, coat and black shoe. Students are also provided with house t-shirt for the ECAs and a sweater for winter. The school provides transportation facilities to students who require bus service to commute to and from the school. Application for the bus service have to be made at the time of admissions and is only available within the periphery of 10kms.

Programs 
Besides +2 in Science and Management program, this college also provides bachelors degree in Microbiology, Bio-chemistry, Food Technology, Pharmacy, Business studies and CSIT. This school also provides masters degree in Microbiology and Bio-technology, and diploma degree in pharmacy and Lab Technician. Among above courses, Bio Chemistry in Bachelor level is affiliated to Purbanchal University. Three years diploma course is affiliated to CTEVT and all the other courses are affiliated to Tribhuvan University of Bachelor and Master Level.

Scholarships 

 Board topper, district topper and entrance topper are provided with full scholarship.
 Entrance exam topper within top 5 ranks get full scholarship, 6-10 ranked student get 80% scholarship and 11-19 students gets scholarship as per rank order in science stream for plus two.
 NIST genius students who are able to secured top 10 ranks within internal exams are awarded with 3 month tuition fee amount.
 Recommended students by HSEB will also be awarded by scholarship.

Facilities 

 Well equipped science and computer labs.
 Well furnished library with all the related books available.
 Basketball court, table tennis board, badminton court and football pitch.
 college tours, annual programs, and industrial visits are conducted at school  to prepare students for future career and enthusiasm towards study.
 Internal assessments, seminars, guest lectures and presentation are conducted regularly.
 Extra tuition is provided to students with need.
 Extra curriculum activities in sports and cultural programs are held throughout the year.
 Hostel for both boys and girls are located in 1 km from the school.

NIST network institutions 
National Institute of Sciences (Lalitpur-NIST) - Gwarko, Lalitpur

Bhaktapur NIST School - Lokanthali, Bhaktapur

Patan NISTA Campus - Bakhundol-03, Lalitpur

Chairman Dr. Madhav Prasad Baral 
As a renowned academician, Dr. Madhav Prasad Baral has a long standing experience and established credentials  as a forerunner in the are of providing both high school and higher education in the country. Dr. Baral completed his MS in Biochemistry and Ph.D. in food chemistry from the university of the Philippines. Upon his return, he served as Senior Scientific Officer for 18 years at NAST, Kathmandu, previously known as RONAST. He was also associated with the central Department of Microbiology, Tribhuwan University and more than 50 students pursuing Microbiology in the Master’s degree completed their dissertation under his supervision.

References

Schools in Kathmandu